Choi Chul-woo (born November 30, 1977) is a former South Korean football player.

His previous club is Ulsan Hyundai Horang-i, Pohang Steelers, Bucheon SK, Jeju United, Jeonbuk Hyundai Motors, Busan I'Park and Ulsan Hyundai Mipo Dockyard. He also spent his final career at Home United in the S-League.

He was a part of the South Korean team at the 2000 Summer Olympics.

Club career statistics

International goals
Results list South Korea's goal tally first.

References

External links
 
 National League Player Record - 최철우 
 National Team Player Record 
 FIFA Player Statistics
 

1977 births
Living people
Association football forwards
South Korean footballers
South Korea international footballers
South Korean expatriate footballers
Ulsan Hyundai FC players
Pohang Steelers players
Jeju United FC players
Jeonbuk Hyundai Motors players
Busan IPark players
home United FC players
K League 1 players
Footballers at the 2000 Summer Olympics
2000 AFC Asian Cup players
Olympic footballers of South Korea
Expatriate footballers in Singapore
Singapore Premier League players
Sportspeople from North Jeolla Province